iproute2 is a collection of userspace utilities for controlling and monitoring various aspects of networking in the Linux kernel, including routing, network interfaces, tunnels, traffic control, and network-related device drivers.

iproute2 is an open-source project released under the terms of version 2 of the GNU General Public License. Its development is closely tied to the development of networking components of the Linux kernel.  , iproute2 is maintained by Stephen Hemminger and David Ahern. The original author, Alexey Kuznetsov, was responsible for the quality of service (QoS) implementation in the Linux kernel.

iproute2 collection contains the following command-line utilities:
arpd, bridge, ctstat, dcb, devlink, ip, lnstat, nstat, rdma, routef, routel, rtacct, rtmon, rtstat, ss, tc and tipc
 tc is used for traffic control.  iproute2 utilities communicate with the Linux kernel using the netlink protocol.  Some of the iproute2 utilities are often recommended over now-obsolete net-tools utilities that provide the same functionality. Below is a table of obsolete utilities and their iproute2 replacements.

See also 

 BusyBox
 ethtool
 TIPC

References

External links 
 
 Linux Advanced Routing and Traffic Control HOWTO - A tutorial in exploring and using iproute2.
 IPROUTE2 Utility Suite Documentation - Complete official documentation.
 iproute2+tc notes - A collection of documents relating to iproute2 configuration and usage.

Linux network-related software
Linux configuration utilities
Linux-only free software
Routing
Internet Protocol based network software
Network performance